Lottia langfordi is a species of sea snail, a true limpet, a marine gastropod mollusk in the family Lottiidae, one of the families of true limpets.

References

Lottiidae
Gastropods described in 1944